Ravenscliffe was a ward in the Borough of Newcastle-under-Lyme, in the county of Staffordshire, England. It covered part of Kidsgrove along with the area of Acres Nook. In 2011 it had a population of 4007.

References

Wards of the Borough of Newcastle-under-Lyme
Kidsgrove